= Performance Seed Dirt Double =

The Performance Seed Dirt Double is a pair of ARCA Menards Series races at dirt tracks:

- Performance Seed Dirt Double (Springfield), the race at the Illinois State Fairgrounds Racetrack
- Performance Seed Dirt Double (DuQuoin), the race at the DuQuoin State Fairgrounds Racetrack
